Benfleet Urban District was an urban district in the county of Essex, England. It was created on 1 October 1929 from the parts of Rochford Rural District containing the civil parishes of Hadleigh, South Benfleet and Thundersley.

Since 1 April 1974 it has formed an unparished area of the borough of Castle Point.

References 

Political history of Essex
Districts of England abolished by the Local Government Act 1972
Castle Point
Urban districts of England
1929 establishments in England
Unparished areas in Essex